Valdomiro may refer to:

 Valdomiro (footballer, born 1946), Brazilian football winger who participated in 1974 FIFA World Cup.
 Valdomiro (footballer, born 1979), Brazilian football centre-back